The Swiss SuperCup was a match that was played between the winners of the Swiss Super League and the Swiss Cup. It was held from 1986 to 1990.

Winners

Total Titles

External links
 Garin, Erik. "Switzerland Super Cup Finals", RSSSF.

Supercup
Switzerland
Recurring sporting events established in 1986
Recurring events disestablished in 1990
1986 establishments in Switzerland
Defunct sports competitions in Switzerland